Avijit Roy (12 September 1972 – 26 February 2015) was a Bangladeshi-American engineer, online activist, writer, and blogger known for creating and administrating the Mukto-Mona (Free-minded), an Internet blogging community for Bangladeshi freethinkers, rationalists, skeptics, atheists, and humanists. Roy was an advocate of free expression in Bangladesh, coordinating international protests against government censorship and imprisonment of atheist bloggers. He was hacked to death by machete-wielding assailants in Dhaka, Bangladesh, on 26 February 2015; Islamic militant organization Ansarullah Bangla Team claimed responsibility for the attack.

Early life and education
He was the son of Ajoy Roy, a professor of physics at the University of Dhaka, who received the Ekushey Padak award. Avijit earned a bachelor's degree in mechanical engineering from BUET. He earned a master's and doctoral degree in biomedical engineering from National University of Singapore.

Career
In 2006, he moved to Atlanta, Georgia, and worked as a software engineer. Roy published eight books in Bengali, he wrote on behalf of explicit atheism, homosexuality, evolution, and astrophysics and also he publicized these things in his own blog (known as Mukto-Mona).

Mukto-Mona
Roy was the founder of the Bangladeshi Mukto-Mona (freethinkers) website which was one of the nominees of The Bobs (Best of Blogs) Award in the Best of Online Activism category. Mukto-Mona began as a Yahoo group in May 2001, but became a website in 2002.

Roy described his writing as "taboo" in Bangladesh. He had received death threats from fundamentalist bloggers for his articles and books. Rokomari.com, a Bangladeshi e-commerce site, stopped selling Roy's books after its owner received death threats from Islamists.

Protests and advocacy

A Bangladeshi group, Blogger and Online Activist Network (BOAN), initiated the 2013 Shahbag protests that sought capital punishment for the Islamist leader and war criminal Abdul Quader Molla as well as the removal of Jamaat-e-Islami from politics. Islamist groups responded by organizng protests calling for the execution of "atheist bloggers" accused of insulting Islam, and the introduction of a blasphemy law. Many atheist bloggers who supported the Shahbag protests came under attack, and Ahmed Rajib Haider was killed by Islamist groups on 15 February 2013. A month before the protest, blogger Asif Mohiuddin was attacked outside his house by four youths influenced by Anwar Al-Awlaki, and Sunnyur Rahman, known as Nastik Nobi ("Atheist Prophet"), was stabbed on 7 March 2013.

Asif Mohiuddin, a winner of the BOBs award for online activism, was on an Islamist hit list that also included the murdered sociology professor Shafiul Islam. Mohiuddin's blog was shut down by the Bangladesh Telecommunication Regulatory Commission, and he was jailed for posting "offensive comments about Islam and Mohammed." The secular government arrested several other bloggers and blocked about a dozen websites and blogs, as well as giving police protection to some bloggers.

International organizations, including Human Rights Watch, Amnesty International, Reporters Without Borders and the Committee to Protect Journalists condemned the imprisonment of bloggers and the climate of fear for journalists.

Roy wrote that he was disgusted that the Bangladeshi media portrayed young bloggers as "crooks in the public eye" and wrote to Western media outlets and the Center for Inquiry and the International Humanist and Ethical Union for support. Roy went on to coordinate international protests in Dhaka, New York City, Washington, D.C., London, Ottawa and other cities in support of the jailed bloggers. He was joined by writers, activists, and prominent secularists and intellectuals around the world including Salman Rushdie, Taslima Nasrin, Hemant Mehta, Maryam Namazie, PZ Myers, Anu Muhammad, Ajoy Roy, Qayyum Chowdhury, Ramendu Majumdar and Muhammad Zafar Iqbal in publicly expressing their solidarity with the arrested bloggers.

Murder
In 2015, Roy went to Dhaka with his wife Bonya during the Ekushey Book Fair. On the evening of 26 February, he and Bonya were returning home from the fair by bicycle rickshaw. At around 8:30 pm, they were attacked near the Teacher-Student Centre intersection of Dhaka University by unidentified assailants. Two assailants stopped and dragged them from the rickshaw to the pavement before striking them with machetes, according to witnesses. Roy was struck and stabbed with sharp weapons in the head. His wife was slashed on her shoulders and the fingers of her left hand were severed. Both of them were rushed to Dhaka Medical College Hospital, where Roy was pronounced dead around 10:30 pm. Bonya survived. In an interview with BBC's Newshour, she said that police stood nearby when they were attacked on the spot but did not act.

In a Twitter post on the day after his death, an Islamist group, calling itself Ansar Bangla-7, claimed responsibility for the killing. Ansar Bangla-7 is said to be the same organization as Ansarullah Bangla Team. A case of murder was filed by Roy's father without naming any suspects at Shahbagh thana on 27 February 2015. According to police sources, they are investigating a local Islamist group that praised the killing.

Avijit's body was placed at Aparajeyo Bangla in front of the Faculty of Arts building (Kala Bhavan) at Dhaka University on 1 March 2015 where people from all walks of life, including his friends, relatives, well-wishers, teachers and students, gathered with flowers to pay their respect to the writer. As per Roy's wish, his body was handed over to Dhaka Medical College for medical research.

On 6 March 2015, a four-member team from the Federal Bureau of Investigation (FBI) along with members of the detective branch of Bangladesh Police inspected the spot where Roy was killed. The FBI members collected evidence from the site and took footage to help in the investigation.

On 3 May 2015, the leader of Al-Qaeda in the Indian Subcontinent (AQIS) claimed responsibility for the murder of Roy and the deaths of other "blasphemers" in Bangladesh in a report published by SITE Intelligence Group.

Arrests
On 2 March 2015, Rapid Action Battalion arrested Farabi Shafiur Rahman, a radical Islamist. It was suspected by the police that Farabi had shared Roy's location, identity, family photographs, etc. with the killer(s). Farabi had threatened Roy several times through blogs and social media sites including Facebook. He said that Roy would be killed upon his arrival in Dhaka.

Bangladesh's government decided to seek help from the Federal Bureau of Investigation to investigate the murder of Roy. The decision was taken following an offer by the United States.

On 18 August 2015, three members of Ansarullah Bangla Team, including a British citizen, named Touhidur Rahman who police described as "the main planner of the attacks on Avijit Roy and Ananta Bijoy Das", had been arrested in connection with the two murders.

In February 2021 five leaders and members of banned militant outfit Ansar al-Islam were sentenced to death and another to life in prison over the brutal murder of writer-blogger Avijit Roy.

Reactions
After the death of Roy, several students, teachers, bloggers and around the country gathered at Dhaka University, demanding quick arrest of the killers. The Mukto-Mona website bore the message in Bengali "We are grieving but we shall overcome" against a black background.

Secretary-General of the United Nations spokesperson Stéphane Dujarric condemned the killing and said "On the attack of the blogger, we spoke to our human rights colleagues who obviously condemned the attack and expressed the hope that the perpetrators will be quickly brought to justice through the due process of law."

The head of Reporters without Borders Asia-Pacific stated "We are shocked by this act of barbarity" and added "It is unacceptable for [police] to spend so much time searching news outlets, arresting journalists, censoring news and investigating bloggers, when the many attacks on bloggers are still unpunished."

The CEO of Index on Censorship, Jodie Ginsberg, said: "Our sympathies are with the family of Avijit Roy. Roy was targeted simply for expressing his own beliefs and we are appalled by his death and condemn all such killings."

The Asia Program Coordinator of the Committee to Protect Journalists stated "This attack is emblematic of the culture of impunity that pervades Bangladesh, where the lack of accountability in previous attacks on the press continues to spurn  a deadly cycle of violence."

Humanist groups expressed horror at the loss of a colleague. The Center for Inquiry's chief UN representative stated "Avijit was brilliant, yes, and a devoted advocate of free expression and secularism, but also just a very good person." Andrew Copson of the British Humanist Association, which awarded Roy and other bloggers the Free Expression Award in 2014, said "With Avijit's death, Bangladesh has lost not just a son, but a forceful proponent of human rights and equality for all its people."

The British High Commissioner Robert Gibson expressed his concern in a tweet saying, "Shocked by the savage murder of Avijit Roy as I am by all the violence that has taken place in Bangladesh in recent months".

In December 2021, the United States Department of State announced a $5m. bounty for information leading to the perpetrators of the terrorist attack on Roy and Ahmed.

Legacy 
In 2018, the Freedom From Religion Foundation introduced the annual Avijit Roy Courage Award, which is given to "individuals working toward the spread of rational and logical discourse, and recognize creative and heroic individuals who have persisted, despite hurdles, in their work to promote science, logic and humane ideas."

Works

See also

 Attacks on secularists in Bangladesh
 Murder of Sagar Sarowar and Meherun Runi
 Political repression of cyber-dissidents
 List of journalists killed in Bangladesh

References

1972 births
2015 deaths
American bloggers
American humanists
American mechanical engineers
American people murdered abroad
American writers of Bangladeshi descent
American atheists
Bangladeshi atheists
Bangladeshi bloggers
Bangladeshi emigrants to the United States
Bangladeshi humanists
Bangladeshi mechanical engineers
Bangladeshi secularists
Bangladeshi writers
Bangladeshi male writers
Bangladesh University of Engineering and Technology alumni
American critics of Islam
Deaths by stabbing in Bangladesh
Assassinated Bangladeshi journalists
People from Atlanta
People from Dhaka
People killed by Islamic terrorism
People murdered in Dhaka
People persecuted by Muslims
University of Singapore alumni
Attacks on secularists in Bangladesh
Writers from Georgia (U.S. state)
Assassinated bloggers
Stabbing attacks in 2015
Terrorist incidents involving knife attacks
Engineers from Georgia (U.S. state)
American male bloggers